"Hunter of Invisible Game" is a short film by Bruce Springsteen that was released on July 9, 2014 through his website. The film is also the music video for the song of the same name which is from Springsteen's eighteenth studio album, High Hopes. The film marks directorial debut of Springsteen who co-directed the film with Thom Zimny. In the film, Springsteen plays a post-apocalyptic survivor, haunted by his past who sets out on his own, recalling times of togetherness with his family as he forages his memories alone.

"For a long part of the year, Thom Zimny and I have been talking about shooting a short film for 'Hunter Of Invisible Game.' We’ve finally got the job done, and we think it's one of our best. Thanks Thom for the hard work and brotherly collaboration. You and your crew bring it all. And to all of you out there in E St. Nation, we hope you enjoy! See ya up the road." – Bruce Springsteen

Cast
Bruce Springsteen - Man
Danielle Panek - Woman
Ludo Roveda - Boy
Isabel Danyluk - Kid #1 in flashback
Raffaela Danyluk - Kid #2 in flashback
Roman Danyluk - Kid #3 in flashback
George Fassbinder
Richard Kall
Ricky Loring
Eric Matheny
Mauricio Toledo
Rossana Roveda
Damien Wallace

References

External links
 

Bruce Springsteen songs
2014 songs
Songs written by Bruce Springsteen
2014 films
Song recordings produced by Brendan O'Brien (record producer)
2010s English-language films